Anatolii Sloiko (born 1 August 1980) is a Ukrainian independent artist and curator. His works vary from painting to writing and film making.

Anatolii studied philosophy and politology at The National University of Kyiv-Mohyla Academy. In summer 2006 he created and headed the unique Totoro Garden Gallery, which hosted more than 60 young artists during its short lifetime.

Personal exhibitions 

 2008 The Unconsciousness Office Art ArtArsenal gallery, Kyiv, Ukraine
 2007 Heart-to-heart   ZEH gallery, Kyiv, Ukraine
 2001 The art of whispering   CCA, Kyiv, Ukraine

References

External links
Anatolii Sloiko at Saatchi Gallery

Ukrainian artists
1980 births
Living people
Artists from Kyiv
National University of Kyiv-Mohyla Academy alumni